Klepalo Hill (‘Halm Klepalo’ \'h&lm kle-'pa-lo\) is the ice-covered hill of elevation 700 m on Pernik Peninsula, Loubet Coast in Graham Land, Antarctica.  It surmounts Dabrava Glacier to the south-southwest and Lallemand Fjord to the west.

The hill is named after the settlement of Klepalo in Southwestern Bulgaria.

Location
British mapping in 1976.

Maps
 Antarctic Digital Database (ADD). Scale 1:250000 topographic map of Antarctica. Scientific Committee on Antarctic Research (SCAR). Since 1993, regularly upgraded and updated.
British Antarctic Territory. Scale 1:200000 topographic map. DOS 610 Series, Sheet W 66 66. Directorate of Overseas Surveys, Tolworth, UK, 1976.

References
 Bulgarian Antarctic Gazetteer. Antarctic Place-names Commission. (details in Bulgarian, basic data in English)
Klepalo Hill. SCAR Composite Antarctic Gazetteer.

External links
 Klepalo Hill. Copernix satellite image

Hills of Graham Land
Bulgaria and the Antarctic
Loubet Coast